Kulafu was one of the earliest comic book heroes in the Philippines.  Created on July 7, 1933, by Filipino illustrator Francisco Reyes and Filipino writer Pedrito Reyes, Kulafu appeared on the first colored adventure strip and the first two-page comic strip in the Philippines, under the same title.

Plot
The storyline about Kulafu was influenced by Tarzan, a character created by Edgar Rice Burroughs.  The story of Kulafu  started when a toddler named "Pido" was snatched by a gigantic bird called "Ibong Malta" from his human mother while she was doing the laundry at a nearby river.  Pido was brought to the Ibong Malta's nest to become the meal of the bird and her mate.  The male Ibong Malta became impatient and tried to devour Pido right away which resulted to a fight between the two gigantic birds.  Pido was accidentally hit by one of the bird's wing and fell from the nest.  As he fell, the child was able to grab hold to one of the eggs of the Ibong Malta.  Luckily, Pido fell on the branches of a big tree which cushioned his fall.  Pido was retrieved by a band of white apes who planned to have Pido as their meal.  However, a female ape intervened and saved Pido.  Eventually, the egg of the Ibong Malta that Pido grabbed  hatched and became Pido's pet.  Pido considered the bird as his brother and became his constant companion ever since. When Pido's Ibong Malta grew to adulthood, it provided Pido with air transportation.

The name Kulafu was coined by a civilized man (not a woman as previously stated) named Magat whom Pido saved from being devoured by a shark (not a cayman as previously claimed).  Magat witnessed a conversation between Guna, Pido's pet monkey and Pido's Ibong Malta. Guna uttered the sound "Kula" repeatedly and the Ibong Malta answered back uttering the sound "fu" also repeatedly.  Because of the combined sounds made by the monkey Guna and the Ibong Malta, Magat concluded that Pido's name was "Kulafu".

Kulafu was raised by the ape who saved him.  He grew up to in the jungles of Southern Philippines during the pre-Spanish era.  Kulafu’s adventures included battling mythical creatures such as dragons and mermen (known as siyokoy in Tagalog), among others.

Kulafu's garment was made from the skin of a tiger.  This story is impossible since no tigers are found in the Philippines.   According to the story, the Sultan of Borneo gave a tiger as a gift to the Sultan of the island where Kulafu dwells. The tiger escaped and was killed by Kulafu in an encounter.  Kulafu's friend Magat helped him create a garment made from the skin of the tiger.

Sequel
A sequel to the original Kulafu series was Anak ni Kulafu (Child of Kulafu), created by Francisco Reyes.

Adaptation
On May 7, 1963, a second komiks magazine named Kulafu Komiks was published by Veritas Publishing Co., Inc.  The magazine was based on the original Kulafu comic book hero created by the Reyeses.

Translation
As one of the most popular heroes and comic strips in the Philippines, Kulafu was translated into other Philippine languages such as Bisaya, Bikolano (Bikolnon), and Ilokano.  It had also been translated into Spanish for a magazine in South America.

Vino Kulafu
Due to the popularity of the Kulafu character in the Philippines,  La Tondeña, Inc. (now Ginebra San Miguel, Inc.) purchased the rights to use the Kulafu name in 1957 for its new brand of Chinese medicinal wine, Vino Kulafu (meaning "Kulafu Wine").

See also
Hagibis

References

External links

Francisco Reyes' Kulafu
Francisco Reyes' Kulafu original art

1933 comics debuts
Fictional Filipino people
Comics characters introduced in 1933
Mascots introduced in 1933
Male characters in comics
Male characters in advertising
Philippine comic strips
Comics magazines published in the Philippines
Jungle superheroes
Jungle men
Adventure comics
Magazine mascots